Mount Avens is a summit in Alberta, Canada.

Mount Avens was so named on account of avens flowers in the area.

References

Avens
Alberta's Rockies